| elevation_footnotes = 
| elevation_m         = 
| twin1               = 
| twin1_country       = 
| saint               = Saints Gervasius and Protasius
| day                 = 19 June
| postal_code         = 38010
| area_code           = 0461
| website             = 
| footnotes           = 
}}

Denno (Dén in local dialect) is a comune in Trentino, northern Italy.

References

External links
 Homepage of the city
 Val di Non